Amara Simba (born 23 December 1961) is a retired French professional footballer who played as a forward.

Club career 
During his career, Simba played for Jeanne d'Arc, FCR Houdanaise, Versailles, Paris Saint-Germain, Cannes, Monaco, Caen and Lille in France, León in Mexico and Leyton Orient, Kingstonian, Kettering Town, Barnet, St. Albans City, Billericay Town and Clacton Town in England.

Simba's move to Leyton Orient came about as a result of training with the club to keep fit whilst on holiday in London.

He was awarded most beautiful goal of the French Division in 1992-93 for a goal in which he received the ball, controlled it with his chest and finished it off with a bicycle kick.

International career 
Simba was also selected to play for the France national team on three occasions, by then manager Michel Platini. He scored one goal, but injury prevented his participation in Euro 92 and his international career came to an end.

Honours

Paris Saint-Germain 
 Coupe de France: 1992-93

References

External links
 
 
 
 Career stats
 

1961 births
Living people
Footballers from Dakar
Senegalese footballers
French footballers
French expatriate footballers
France international footballers
Senegalese emigrants to France
Ligue 1 players
Liga MX players
English Football League players
National League (English football) players
Isthmian League players
ASC Jeanne d'Arc players
FC Versailles 78 players
Paris Saint-Germain F.C. players
Lille OSC players
Stade Malherbe Caen players
AS Monaco FC players
AS Cannes players
Leyton Orient F.C. players
Barnet F.C. players
Kettering Town F.C. players
Kingstonian F.C. players
St Albans City F.C. players
Billericay Town F.C. players
F.C. Clacton players
Club León footballers
Expatriate footballers in Mexico
Expatriate footballers in England
French expatriate sportspeople in Mexico
French expatriate sportspeople in England
Association football forwards